The Connecticut Military Department is a state agency of the government of Connecticut. Its primary components are the 
Connecticut Army National Guard, the Connecticut Air National Guard, and four companies of the state militia. The Military Department of the State of Connecticut traces its origins to May 11, 1637, when the "General Courts" (colonial assembly - legislature) established a military arm of the provincial government. In 1939, the State's Military Department was established to consolidate the offices of  Adjutant General, Quartermaster General, Armory Board, and Armory Board Inspector.

Mission
The Military Department of the State of Connecticut's principle public responsibility is to serve as the protector of American citizens of the State and their property in time of war, invasion, rebellion, riot or disaster. It serves as the main resource for the Governor in ensuring public safety in a variety of emergencies.

The Connecticut National Guard as the state militia also has a Federal Constitutional mission to support the President of the United States as Commander-in-Chief of the Armed Forces of the United States and the Federal Government in times of War or National Emergencies.

Components

Connecticut National Guard
The Constitution of the United States specifically grants the U.S. Congress the power to "raise armies." The U.S. Army, Navy, Air Force are armies raised under this provision. Additionally, the States, under the 2nd and 10th Amendments, have the right to raise their own armies, historically known as militias, today known as a State Defense Force (SDF). After the civil war, many states reduced funding for their militias and military training programs causing the threat of a reduction in war preparedness. As a result, Congress decided to raise a new federal army to be jointly administered by the states alongside the state defense forces: that army is known as the National Guard of the United States. Like the state militia/SDF, the National Guard is typically administered by the governors. Unlike the militia/SDF, the National Guard may be deployed abroad without the permission of the state governor, whereas the militia/SDF is under the exclusive authority of the states except in the rare event of invasion of the United States or domestic insurrection as specified in Article I Section 8 of the U.S. Constitution.

The Federal mission assigned to the National Guard is: "To provide properly trained and equipped units for prompt mobilization for war, National Emergency or as otherwise needed."

The state mission assigned to the National Guard is "To provide trained and disciplined forces for domestic emergencies or as otherwise provided by state law."
 
The Connecticut National Guard bestows a number of decorations for services to or on behalf of the state.

Major General Francis J. Evon, Jr. is the current Connecticut Adjutant General (TAG).

Connecticut Army National Guard
The Connecticut Army National Guard was originally formed in 1672. During the War of 1812, the Federalist state government refused to place the state militia under control of the Democratic-Republican national government, which resulted in friction, especially following British attacks on New London and Stonington.

After the American Civil War came to an end in 1865, a segregated company was raised in the Fifth battalion of the Connecticut National Guard so that men of color in New Haven could serve their state. Company A (1870-1919), bearing throughout its service monikers to honor its primary instigator, James H. Wilkins - a sergeant with the famous 54th Massachusetts Volunteer Infantry during the Civil War who bore the national flag at the Battle of Olustee - was also known as the Wilkins Guard, the Wilkins Old Guard, and the Wilkins Tigers.

The Militia Act of 1903 organized the various state militias into the present National Guard system.

The 102d Infantry Regiment fought with the 26th Infantry Division in World War I and then served with the 43d Infantry Division from 1924 to 1951-52, including World War II and a deployment to West Germany during the Korean War. Other major historical regiments of Connecticut were the 169th Infantry Regiment and 192d Field Artillery.

After 1968, the main formation in the state became the 43d Infantry Brigade of the 26th Infantry Division.

Today, the Connecticut Army National Guard is composed of approximately 5,000 soldiers.   It maintains facilities in 22 communities.  In 1999, these facilities included 22 armories, eight maintenance shops, four aviation facilities, four training site facilities.

Its units include the 85th Troop Command, 143rd Area Support Group, 14th Civil Support Team (WMD), 248th Engineer Company, 250th Engineer Company, 143d and 643d Military Police Companies, 141st and 142d Medical Companies, the 143d Combat Service Support Battalion (formerly FSB), the 1109th Aviation Depot (AVCRAD), the 169th Regiment (RTI), and the 192d Military Police Battalion. The primary combat unit is the 1st Battalion, 102d Infantry Regiment, assigned to the 86th Infantry Brigade Combat Team, which is headquartered in Vermont.

Aviation

One base is the Army Aviation Support Facility at Bradley International Airport where the 1st Battalion, 169th Aviation Regiment operate the CH-47F, UH-60A/L, HH-60M & C-12U The unit also operates Detachment 2, Company C, 3d Battalion, 126th Aviation Regiment (HH-60M) and Company B, 2d Battalion (General Support), 104th Aviation Regiment (CH-47F)

Connecticut Air National Guard

The Connecticut Air National Guard traces its history back to World War I with the beginnings also of the United States Army Air Service. It comprises approximately 1,200 airmen and officers assigned to the 103rd Airlift Wing and 103rd Air Control Squadron. The 103rd Airlift Wing is  based in East Granby at the Bradley Air National Guard Base at Bradley International Airport.

Known as the "Flying Yankees", the 103rd Airlift Wing is the third-oldest Air National Guard unit in the United States with a history dating back to World War I. Until 2008, the organization was known as the 103rd Fighter Wing (103 FW), operationally gained by the Air Combat Command (ACC) and equipped with A-10 Thunderbolt aircraft.  As a result of Base Realignment and Closure (BRAC) actions, the wing's A-10 fighter aircraft were reassigned to other units and the 103rd reequipped with C-21 Learjet aircraft as a "placeholder" flying mission under the Air National Guard's VANGUARD program until the 103rd's next flying mission could be determined.  Following this change in mission, the unit was redesignated the 103rd Airlift Wing and placed under the operational claimancy of Air Mobility Command (AMC).

The 103rd Air Control Squadron is based in Orange, Connecticut, and is known as "Yankee Watch". The mission of the 103rd Air Control Squadron is real-time detection, identification and surveillance of air traffic for combat operations and homeland defense.  The 103rd ACS is the oldest unit of its kind in the United States military.

The Connecticut Air National Guard counts one astronaut amongst its former members, Jack Swigert, who flew on Apollo 13. Swigert served with the CT ANG from April 1960 to October 1965.

Brigadier General Daniel L Peabody is the current Assistant Adjutant General-Air, for the CT ANG.

Connecticut State Guard
The Connecticut State Guard is the organized militia portion of the state military. As a State Defense Force it is a military entity authorized by both the State Code of Connecticut and Executive Order. The State Defense Force (SDF) is the state’s authorized militia and assumes the state mission of the Connecticut National Guard in the event the Guard is mobilized. The SDF comprises retired active and reserve military personnel and selected professional persons who volunteer their time and talents in further service to their state.

Connecticut's state defense force consists of four active units known as the Governor's Guards.  There are two foot guard units and two horse guard units which I preserve the lineage and heritage of Connecticut's infantry and cavalry units since the colonial period.  While all four companies are primarily ceremonial, the horse companies do drill in mounted search and rescue.  The First Company of the Horse Guard was created in 1788 as the Independent Volunteer Troop of Horse Guards in Hartford.  A second Horse Guard company was created in 1808 in New Haven.  Both were created to serve and protect the governor between his travels between New Haven and Hartford.

The Connecticut State Guard Reserve is currently inactive.

Connecticut Naval Militia
The Naval militia of the state remains an authorized force by state statute, but has been inactive for several decades with no current membership.

Agency history

The Agency traces its roots to May 11, 1637, when the General Courts of the Colony of Connecticut established a military arm of the government.  This arm of the colony's government was responsible for overseeing and regulating the militiamen of the colony.  Agency personnel participated in several wars with Native Americans as well as with and against European colonial powers.

After the American Revolution, the new State of Connecticut established the office of the Adjutant General in 1792 to oversee the Armed Forces of the State.  Units of the Connecticut State Militia participated in all wars of the United States.

The Connecticut Military Department was officially established as a state agency in 1939 by Chapter 345 of the Public Acts.  The act consolidated the office of the Adjutant General, the Quartermaster General, the Armory Board and the Armory Board Inspector.  In response to the coordination efforts of civil authorities to the Flood of 1955 in which Governor Abraham Ribicoff mobilized the National Guard, the Office of Civil Defense was created as a sub-agency of the Connecticut Military Department.  Authority over the Office of Civil Defense was transferred to the Department of Public Safety in 1979 and back to the Military Department in 1999.  In 2005, Public Act 04-219 created the Connecticut Department of Emergency Management and Homeland Security and once again removed overall domestic emergency response away from the Military Department.  The Military Department remains as the largest force provider to the Governor during times of domestic emergencies.

See also

 List of Connecticut Adjutant Generals
 Connecticut National Guard
 Connecticut Air National Guard
 Connecticut Army National Guard
 Connecticut Naval Militia
 Governor's Guards
Awards of the Connecticut National Guard
List of United States militia units in the American Revolutionary War

References

External links

United States Army Center of Military History, Bibliography of Connecticut Army National Guard History
GlobalSecurity.org, Connecticut Army National Guard, accessed 20 Nov 2006

Military in Connecticut
State agencies of Connecticut
Connecticut National Guard
Government agencies established in 1939
1939 establishments in Connecticut